Kinsey is an unincorporated community in Jackson Township, Kosciusko County, in the U.S. state of Indiana.

History
The railroad was extended to Kinsey in the early 1880s. A post office opened as Kinzie in 1882, and remained in operation until it was discontinued in 1907.

Geography

References

Unincorporated communities in Kosciusko County, Indiana
Unincorporated communities in Indiana